David Walser (12 March 1923 – 1 October 1993) was a priest in the Church of England.

Walser was educated at Clayesmore School. During World War II he served with the Royal Artillery after which he studied at St Edmund Hall, Oxford and St Stephen's House. He was ordained in 1951. After a curacy at St Gregory the Great's Horfield he was vice-principal of St Stephen's House. He was a minor canon of Ely Cathedral from 1961 to 1971 when he became the Rector of Linton. He became Rector of St Botolph's Church, Cambridge and Archdeacon of Ely in 1981 and died shortly after retiring in 1993.

References

1923 births
People educated at Clayesmore School
Alumni of St Edmund Hall, Oxford
Royal Artillery officers
Archdeacons of Ely
1993 deaths
British Army personnel of World War II